was an 8th dan Japanese judoka and author. He has written many books about judo. He was also the curator of the Kodokan Judo Museum in Tokyo.

Biography 
Murata was born in Tokorozawa, Saitama in 1949. He studied at the Faculty of Physical Education, Department of Martial Arts of the Tokyo University of Education, where he obtained the MA degree in physical fitness in 1973. He has been a judo instructor in more than ten countries, including Iceland and Thailand. He also worked as an assistant professor at Kagawa University. He was a curator of the Kodokan Judo Museum and Library. In July 2008, he has been appointed the Head of Directors of the Japanese Academy of Budo, chairman of the All Japan Judo Federation's Committee of Education and Proliferation of Judo as well as a member of the federation's Referee Committee. In 2013 he was promoted to the rank of 8th dan in Kodokan judo.
Murata died on 9 April 2020 at the age of 70.

Bibliography 
 Supotsu to shintai undo no kagakuteki tankyu (A Scientific Investigation of Sports and Physical Exercise), Bikosha
 Wa-ei taisho judo yogo kojiten (A Small Japanese-English Dictionary of Judo Vocabulary), Kodokan
 Wa-ei taisho judo - sono kokoro to kihon (Japanese-English Judo - Its Mind and Basics), Hon no Tomosha
 Gendai jūdōron: kokusaika jidai no jūdō o kangaeru (Modern Judo), Taishukan shoten, 1993 
 Jūdō daijiten (Great Judo Dictionary), Atene shobo, 1999 
 Budo o shiru (Knowing Budo), Fumaido Shuppan, 2000
 Judo no shiten (The Judo Point of View), Dowa shoten, 2000 
 Kanō Jigorō shihan ni manabu (Learning from Jigoro Kano), Nihon Budokan, 2001 
 Mind over muscle: writings from the founder of Judo, Kodansha International, 2005 
 L'essence du judo (Essence of Judo), Noisy-sur-École, 2007

References

External links
 Official profile 

1949 births
2020 deaths
Japanese male judoka
Japanese writers
University of Tsukuba alumni
People from Tokorozawa, Saitama
Sportspeople from Saitama Prefecture
Writers from Saitama Prefecture